The Female Myungin (Korean: 여류명인전, Hanja: 女流名人戰) was a Go competition in South Korea. Begun in 1999, it was held 17 times and was discontinued after 2016. The word of myungin in Korean language, literally meaning "Brilliant Man", is same as meijin in Japanese and as mingren in Chinese.

Past winners and runners-up

References

External links
Korea Baduk Association (in Korean)

Go competitions in South Korea